Hellmut Wolff (30 March 1906 – 22 March 1986), was a German academic, mystic, Germanic revivalist, and most notably a Pendulum dowser. He was used by the German military during the Third Reich.

Wolff was mentioned throughout the book Reveal the Power of the Pendulum by Karl Spiesberger.

See also
Nazi occultism
Pendulum
Dowsing
Karl Spiesberger
Wilhelm Wulff

External links
German biography
The Life of Kummer from the Odinist Library
More information on Wolff' books

Academic staff of the University of Wittenberg
1906 births
1986 deaths
Dowsing
German modern pagans
Adherents of Germanic neopaganism